The Fires of Youth is a 1917 American silent drama film directed by Emile Chautard and starring Frederick Warde, Helen Badgley and Ernest Howard.

Cast
 Frederick Warde as Iron Hearted Pemberton 
 Helen Badgley as Billy 
 Ernest Howard as Billy's Father 
 Jeanne Eagels as Billy's Sister 
 Robert Vaughn as Jim 
 James Ewens
 Carey L. Hastings
 Grace Stevens

References

Bibliography
 Robert B. Connelly. The Silents: Silent Feature Films, 1910-36, Volume 40, Issue 2. December Press, 1998.

External links
 

1917 films
1917 drama films
1910s English-language films
American silent feature films
Silent American drama films
American black-and-white films
Films directed by Emile Chautard
Pathé Exchange films
1910s American films